Worms Will Turn is a 1914 American silent comedy film featuring Oliver Hardy.

Plot

Cast
 Raymond McKee as Bill Raggles
 Ed Lawrence as Police Chief
 Julia Calhoun as Matilda
 Oliver Hardy as A Policeman (as Babe Hardy)

See also
 List of American films of 1914
 Oliver Hardy filmography

External links

1914 films
American silent short films
American black-and-white films
1914 comedy films
1914 short films
Films directed by Frank Griffin
Silent American comedy films
American comedy short films
1910s American films